The Descendant is a Canadian drama film, directed by Philippe Spurrell and released in 2007. The film stars Tadhg MacMahon as James, a man whose mother has recently died; discovering an old shoebox filled with birthday cards from his grandparents that he never received, he decides to go visit his grandparents, Maurice (Jim Reid) and Linda (Ilona Garcen) in the hopes of understanding why his mother broke off contact with them, only to unwittingly uncover supernatural hints of their community's history of slavery.

The film premiered on the festival circuit in 2007, before opening theatrically in Quebec in 2008.

C.J. Goldman received a Jutra Award nomination for Best Makeup at the 11th Jutra Awards in 2009.

References

External links

2007 films
2007 drama films
Canadian drama films
Films shot in Quebec
Films set in Quebec
Quebec films
2000s Canadian films
Films about slavery